Parkia balslevii is a species of flowering plant in the family Fabaceae, that is endemic to Ecuador. Its natural habitats are subtropical or tropical moist lowland forests and subtropical or tropical moist montane forests.

References

balslevii
Endemic flora of Ecuador
Least concern plants
Taxonomy articles created by Polbot